Mick Peppard (28 April 1877 – 30 January 1939) was an Australian rules footballer who played with Fitzroy and Essendon in the Victorian Football League (VFL).

Sources
Holmesby, Russell & Main, Jim (2009). The Encyclopedia of AFL Footballers. 8th ed. Melbourne: Bas Publishing.

Essendon Football Club profile

Australian rules footballers from Victoria (Australia)
Fitzroy Football Club players
Essendon Football Club players
1877 births
1939 deaths